Andrei Lvovich Abrikosov (14 November 1906 – 21 October 1973) was a Soviet and Russian stage and film actor. People's Artist of the USSR (1968).

Biography 
He was born in Simferopol to an agronomist family.

Member of the Communist Party from 1950.

He died in Moscow, and was buried at the Novodevichy Cemetery.

Filmography

Awards and honors 

 Order of the Red Banner of Labour (1939)
 Stalin Prize, 1st class (1941)
 Honored Artist of the RSFSR (1946)
 Medal "For Valiant Labour in the Great Patriotic War 1941–1945" (1946)
 Order of the Red Banner of Labour (1946)
 Medal "In Commemoration of the 800th Anniversary of Moscow" (1948)
 People's Artist of the RSFSR (1952)
 People's Artist of the USSR (1968)
 Jubilee Medal "In Commemoration of the 100th Anniversary of the Birth of Vladimir Ilyich Lenin" (1970)

References

External links

1906 births
1973 deaths
20th-century Russian male actors
Actors from Simferopol
Communist Party of the Soviet Union members
Honored Artists of the RSFSR
People's Artists of the RSFSR
People's Artists of the USSR
Stalin Prize winners
Recipients of the Order of the Red Banner of Labour
Russian male film actors
Russian male silent film actors
Russian male stage actors
Soviet male film actors
Soviet male silent film actors
Soviet male stage actors
Burials at Novodevichy Cemetery